Haven Brothers Diner in Providence, Rhode Island is one of the oldest restaurants on wheels in America and was founded in 1893 (although their truck says 1888) as a horse-drawn lunch wagon.

History
In 1888, 
Widowed immigrant Anne Philomena Haven (1842—1912) founded the diner business with the proceeds from her husband Patrick's life insurance policy. The "lunch cart" (as the family called it) was purchased in Worcester, Massachusetts, originally a horse-drawn wagon. Her daughter Catherine Gannon and Catherine's husband Dennis Gannon continued to run the diner with the help of their young sons William and John. Dennis continued to run the business until he sold it to his daughters Catherine, Anne, Tibertus, and Marian. The Haven family finally sold the business in 1953 to the Mollicone family, and later owners included Jack Ferry, and the Giusti family. Every evening at 4:30, the proprietor wheels the 1949 Fred W. Morse diner car (the third wagon in the diner's history) to the corner of Dorrance and Fulton streets next to the Providence City Hall and Kennedy Plaza. After it closes, the diner is wheeled away to Federal Hill.

Once in its history, Haven Brothers set up shop in a location far from Providence. On April 9, 2008 the diner was brought to Mid-town Manhattan and parked outside the NBC Studios at 30 Rockefeller Plaza for the Today Show. Hosts Meredith Vieira and Matt Lauer had both worked at the NBC 10 studios in Providence two blocks from Havens Brothers time-honored location beside Providence City Hall, and each had chosen it as their favorite old-time diner.

In 2011, the diner was featured on the Travel Channel's Man v. Food Nation, hosted by Adam Richman.

References

External links
Pictures and Review on Roadfood.com
Quahog.org Description

Rhode Island culture
Restaurants in Rhode Island
Buildings and structures in Providence, Rhode Island
Diners in Rhode Island
Tourist attractions in Providence, Rhode Island
Restaurants established in 1888
1888 establishments in Rhode Island